January Jones may refer to:
January Jones (born 1978), American actress
January Jones (singer), mid 20th century American pop singer
"January Jones", song by Johnny Carver on the 1974 album Please Don't Tell (That Sweet Ole Lady of Mine)